Wyndham Hotels & Resorts, Inc. is an American hotel company based in Parsippany, New Jersey, United States. It describes itself as the largest hotel franchisor in the world, with 9,280 locations. It has a portfolio of 20 hotel brands, including Baymont, Days Inn, Howard Johnson, La Quinta, Ramada, Super 8, Travelodge, and Wyndham.

The company was formed on June 1, 2018, as a spin-off from Wyndham Worldwide, which is now known as Travel + Leisure.

History

Background (1990–2006)
The company's origins can be traced to the founding of Hospitality Franchise Systems (HFS) in 1990, created as a vehicle to acquire hotel franchises. By 1995, it had acquired the Days Inn, Howard Johnson, Ramada, and Super 8 brands. HFS then expanded into other businesses, and, in 1997, merged with CUC International to form Cendant Corporation.

In 2005, Cendant bought the Wyndham hotel brand from the Blackstone Group. The Wyndham hotel brand was created in 1981 in Dallas, Texas, by Trammell Crow, the president of Trammell Crow Company. The company appears to have been named after a friend of Crow's, a woman named Wyndham Robertson, who wrote a profile of him for Fortune. As the chain grew, it was acquired in 1998 by Patriot American Hospitality,  later named Wyndham International. Blackstone had bought Wyndham International earlier in 2005.

In 2006, as part of a plan to break Cendant up into four separate companies, its hotel and timeshare businesses were spun off as Wyndham Worldwide.

Wyndham Hotel Group (2006–2018) 
As a division of Wyndham Worldwide, Wyndham Hotel Group was composed of more than 9,000 hotels under 21 brands, located in over 75 countries, competing in brand markets ranging from economy to upscale.  It had more than 40,000 employees around the world. Lodging management services were provided to upscale properties through Wyndham Hotel Management.

In 2008, Wyndham purchased U.S. Franchise Systems, owner of the Microtel and Hawthorn Suites brands, from Global Hyatt Corporation for $150 million.

Wyndham bought the Wisconsin-based Exel Inn chain in 2008 and converted all 22 of its properties to Wyndham brands.

In 2010, Wyndham acquired the TRYP hotel brand from Sol Meliá Hotels & Resorts of Spain. The brand, subsequently renamed Tryp by Wyndham, was positioned as a "select-service, midmarket" brand representing approximately 13,000 rooms and caters to business and leisure travelers in cosmopolitan cities including Madrid, Barcelona, Paris, Lisbon, New York, Frankfurt, Montevideo, Buenos Aires, São Paulo, Istanbul, etc.

In late 2016, Wyndham acquired Latin America's leading Fën Hotels, adding 26 management contracts across Argentina, Peru, Costa Rica, Uruguay, Paraguay, Bolivia, and the U.S., including two new Fën-built Wyndham Grand hotels in Uruguay and Paraguay. With the addition of Fën Hotels' signature Esplendor Boutique Hotel and Dazzler Hotel brands, Wyndham Hotel Group's portfolio of distinct brands grew to 18.

In the summer of 2017, Wyndham announced plans to acquire the Minnesota-based AmericInn hotel brand and its management company, Three Rivers Hospitality, from Northcott Hospitality for $170 million. AmericInn's portfolio consisted of 200 primarily franchised hotels with approximately 11,600 rooms in 22 states, predominately in the Midwestern U.S., Ohio Valley, and Mountain states.

In August 2017, Wyndham announced plans to spin off Wyndham Hotel Group to shareholders as a separate publicly traded company.

In October 2017, Wyndham launched its first soft brand product, the Trademark Hotel Collection, a collection of more than 50 upper-midscale-and-above hotels in Europe and the U.S.

In April 2018, the company began rebranding most of its brands to include the Wyndham name, such as "Days Inn by Wyndham", "Ramada by Wyndham", and "Super 8 by Wyndham".

On May 30, 2018, Wyndham purchased the La Quinta hotel brand (franchised to 900 hotels with over 89,000 rooms) and its associated management business, for $1.95 billion in cash.

Wyndham Hotels & Resorts (2018–present)
The spin-off of Wyndham's hotel business occurred on May 31, 2018, creating Wyndham Hotels & Resorts, a hotel group with 22 brands and over 9000 hotels across more than 80 countries.

Brands 
Wyndham Hotels & Resorts includes 24 brands, split into six categories:

Distinctive 
 Registry
 Wyndham Grand

Upscale 
 Dolce Hotels and Resorts
 Wyndham

Lifestyle 

 TRYP
 Esplendor Boutique Hotels
 Dazzler
 Trademark Collection
 Vienna House
 Wyndham Alltra

Midscale 

 La Quinta Inns & Suites
 Wingate
 Wyndham Garden
 AmericInn
 Ramada
 Ramada Encore
 Baymont

Economy 

 Microtel Inn & Suites
 Days Inn
 Super 8
 Howard Johnson
 Travelodge

Extended Stay 

 Hawthorn Suites
 Echo Suites

Wyndham Franchisee Association
Wyndham Destinations' franchisees have formed an independent association called Owners 8 Association to present their concerns and grievances to Wyndham Destinations. The association has argued that individual franchisees have currently limited role in Wyndham's decision making.

Wyndham Hotel Group's Former CEO Eric A. Danziger, in an interview in 2009 with Asian Indian Hotel Owners magazine, emphasized that Wyndham maintains cordial relationships with franchisees. He also stated that each of Wyndham's brands maintains an advisory board of individual property owners.

Legal cases
The Federal Trade Commission (FTC) filed suit against Wyndham in June 2012 following a security breach that led to the theft of payment card data for hundreds of thousands of Wyndham customers.   Wyndham decided to fight the lawsuit in court, unlike many companies, which often try to settle FTC data-security enforcement actions quickly.     In April 2014, United States District Court for the District of New Jersey Judge Esther Salas denied Wyndham's motion to dismiss, in a much-anticipated decision to this case.

See also

References

External links

Companies based in Morris County, New Jersey
Hospitality companies established in 1981
Parsippany-Troy Hills, New Jersey
1981 establishments in Texas
Hotel chains in the United States
Companies listed on the New York Stock Exchange
Corporate spin-offs